The 1985 Minnesota Twins finished with a record of 77–85, tied for fourth in the American League West, and 14 games behind the division winner and eventual World Series champion Kansas City Royals.

Offseason
 October 17, 1984: Albert Williams was released by the Twins.
 January 3, 1985: Mike Benjamin was drafted by the Twins in the 7th round of the 1985 Major League Baseball draft, but did not sign.
 January 9, 1985: Jack O'Connor was traded by the Twins to the Montreal Expos for Mike Stenhouse.
 March 27, 1985: Brad Havens was traded by the Twins to the Baltimore Orioles for Mark Brown.

Regular season
On June 20, after a disappointing start, manager Billy Gardner was replaced by Ray Miller.

Minnesota, the Twins and the Metrodome hosted the All-Star Game.  Only one Twins player made the American League team, outfielder Tom Brunansky. Bruno finished second in the first-ever Home Run Derby, behind Dave Parker.  Three Minnesota natives, not yet Twins, played as a team on the same major league field for the first and only time -- Dave Winfield, Jack Morris and Paul Molitor.

In Anaheim on August 4, pitcher Frank Viola gave up a double to longtime-Twin now-an Angel Rod Carew.  The two-bagger was Carew's 3000th career hit.

The pitcher on the mound on September 25, as the Twins won their 2000th game, is the same pitcher that won Minnesota's 1000th game on July 12, 1972 -- Bert Blyleven.

1,651,814 fans attended Twins games, a Twins attendance record, but still the sixth lowest total in the American League.

Offense
Leadoff batter Kirby Puckett hit .288 and scored 80 runs.
Kent Hrbek hit .311 with 21 HR and 93 RBI.
Tom Brunansky hit 27 HR and 90 RBI.
Gary Gaetti hit 20 HR and 63 RBI.

Pitching
For the first time in years, the Twins had three solid starting pitchers: Frank Viola (18-14), Mike Smithson (15-14), and John Butcher (11-14).
Reliever Ron Davis had 25 saves.

Season standings

Record vs. opponents

Notable transactions
 April 4, 1985: Lenny Faedo was released by the Twins.
 August 1, 1985: Curt Wardle, Jay Bell, Jim Weaver, and a player to be named later were traded by the Twins to the Cleveland Indians for Bert Blyleven. The Twins completed the deal by sending Rich Yett to the Indians on September 17.
The Twins drafted pitcher Jeff Bumgarner with the thirteenth overall pick in the 1985 Draft.

Roster

Player stats

Batting

Starters by position
Note: Pos = Position; G = Games played; AB = At bats; H = Hits; Avg. = Batting average; HR = Home runs; RBI = Runs batted in

Other batters
Note: G = Games played; AB = At bats; H = Hits; Avg. = Batting average; HR = Home runs; RBI = Runs batted in

Pitching

Starting pitchers
Note: G = Games pitched; IP = Innings pitched; W = Wins; L = Losses; ERA = Earned run average; SO = Strikeouts

Other pitchers
Note: G = Games pitched; IP = Innings pitched; W = Wins; L = Losses; ERA = Earned run average; SO = Strikeouts

Relief pitchers
Note: G = Games pitched; W = Wins; L = Losses; SV = Saves; ERA = Earned run average; SO = Strikeouts

Farm system 

LEAGUE CHAMPIONS: Kenosha

Notes

References

Player stats from www.baseball-reference.com
Team info from www.baseball-almanac.com

Minnesota Twins seasons
Minnesota Twins season
Minnesota Twins